Richard Steuart may refer to:

 Richard D. Steuart (1880–1951), journalist in Baltimore, Maryland
 Richard Sprigg Steuart (1797–1876), Maryland physician